20/20 is the twentieth studio album by Canadian rock band Saga. The album marked the return of original singer Michael Sadler.
The album charted at No. 13 in Germany, the highest since their 1985 release Behaviour.

Track listing
All songs written by Saga.

Credits
Michael Sadler – vocals
Ian Crichton – guitars
Jim Crichton – bass, keyboards
Jim Gilmour – keyboards, vocals
Brian Doerner – drums, percussion

References

2012 albums
Saga (band) albums